The Audi Q2 is a subcompact luxury crossover SUV developed and manufactured by Audi. It was first unveiled to the public on 1 March 2016 at the 2016 Geneva Motor Show and built on Volkswagen Group's MQB A1 platform as the Mk7 series Volkswagen Golf. The car is manufactured at the headquarters of Audi in Ingolstadt, Germany; by FAW-Volkswagen in Foshan, China; and in Relizane, Algeria.

It has been sold since November 2016 in markets in Europe. Unlike Audi's other crossovers, the Q2 is not sold in the United States or Canada. A long-wheelbase version called the Q2L is sold in China.

The Q2L e-tron is an all-electric version that has been built and sold in China since November 2019.

In February 2022, Volkswagen AG confirmed that the Audi Q2 will be discontinued after the model completes its current generation life cycle at the end of the 2023 model year without a successor planned, due to poor sales and plans to shift Audi into selling larger premium crossovers and SUVs.

Design
The Q2's front face is formed flat and in an upwards slant, like the other models of Audi's Q Series. The interior incorporates a 5.8 inch Audi MMI display and a 12.3 inch virtual cockpit display.

The car also employs an LED ambient lighting system, which projects differently coloured light into the car, depending on the time of day.

Pricing 
The Q2 subcompact SUV has three trim levels:
 SE, Sport
 S line
 Edition #1

Technical data

References

External links

  (German)

Q2
Mini sport utility vehicles
Luxury crossover sport utility vehicles
All-wheel-drive vehicles
Crossover sport utility vehicles
Cars introduced in 2016
Cars discontinued in 2023
2020s cars
Production electric cars